Beau Geste is a 1926 American silent drama film directed by Herbert Brenon and based on the 1924 novel Beau Geste by P. C. Wren. Ronald Colman stars as the title character.

Plot

Major de Beaujolais leads a French Foreign Legion battalion across the Sahara desert to relieve Fort Zinderneuf, reportedly besieged by Arabs. When he arrives, he receives no response from the Legionnaires manning the walls, only a single shot. He realizes they are dead. The trumpeter volunteers to scale the wall and open the gate, but after waiting 15 minutes, the major climbs inside himself. He finds the dead commandant with a note in his hand addressed to the chief of police of Scotland Yard which states that the writer is solely responsible for the theft of the "Blue Water" sapphire from Lady Patricia Brandon. Soon after, the bodies of the commandant and the man beside him disappear. Then the fort is set afire. The major sends two Americans to fetch reinforcements.

The film then flashes back fifteen years to Kent, England. The three young Geste brothers and a girl named Isobel stage a naval battle with toy ships. When John Geste is accidentally shot in the leg, Michael "Beau" Geste digs the bullet out, then tells John that he is worthy of a Viking's funeral. Beau burns one ship, along with a toy soldier and a "dog" (broken off a vase). Beau then gets Digby, his other brother, to promise to give him a Viking's funeral if he dies first.

Lady Patricia cares for the Gestes, her orphaned nephews, while Isobel is her husband's niece. She introduces them to Rajah Ram Singh and then-Captain Henri de Beaujolais. Lady Patricia is in financial straits; her estranged husband "has taken every penny that comes from the estate."

After the children become adults, she receives a telegram, announcing that her husband intends to sell the "Blue Water", a family jewel. She has it brought to her. Someone turns out the lights and steals it. The next morning, Beau is gone, leaving Digby a note claiming to be the thief. Digby follows, writing to John that he is the culprit. John tells Isobel that he took the jewel and departs too.

John joins the Foreign Legion and is reunited with his brothers. Boldini overhears them joking about the jewel. That night, Boldini is caught stealing Beau's belt. Boldini tells Sergeant Lejaune about the jewel, supposedly hidden in Beau's belt. Lejaune assigns Digby and his American friends Hank and Buddy to Beaujolais, while he, Beau and John join a detachment, commanded by Lieutenant Maurel, marching to Fort Zinderneuf.

After Maurel dies, Lejaune assumes command at the fort. After a fortnight of Lejaune's cruelty, some of the men plot mutiny. Beau, John and three others remain loyal. Boldini tells Beau and John that Lejaune knows about the mutiny and plans to have the men kill each other so there will be no witnesses to his theft of the jewel. Lejaune arms the loyalists, then demands that Beau give him the jewel for "safekeeping", but is rebuffed. Lejaune captures the mutineers, but an Arab attack forces him to release and arm them.

When a Legionnaire is killed, Lejaune props up his body on the battlement and makes it appear he is still alive. Finally, only Lejaune, Beau and John remain. Then Beau is seemingly killed. When John sees Lejaune searching Beau's body, he grabs his bayonet, but Lejaune draws his pistol and sentences him to death. Beau, barely alive, grabs Lejaune's leg, enabling John to stab him. Before dying, Beau tells John to desert and deliver a letter to their aunt. When John spots the relief force, he fires a single shot, then departs.

Digby, the trumpeter, climbs in and finds Beau's body. Remembering his childhood promise, he gives his brother a Viking's funeral, with a dog (Lejaune) at his feet. Then he deserts and finds John. They run into Hank and Buddy. Five days later, they are lost, with little water and only one camel left. Digby leaves a letter for the sleeping John (stating that one camel can carry three, but not four) and walks away.

John returns home to his love Isobel and delivers Beau's letter to Lady Patricia. She reads it aloud. Beau tells how he witnessed her selling the Blue Water to Ram Singh. To protect her, Beau stole the imitation.

Cast

Ronald Colman as Michael "Beau" Geste
Neil Hamilton as Digby Geste
Ralph Forbes as John Geste
Alice Joyce as Lady Patricia Brandon
Mary Brian	as Isobel
Noah Beery	as Sergeant Lejaune
Norman Trevor as Major de Beaujolais
William Powell as Boldini
George Regas as Maris
Bernard Siegel as Schwartz
Victor McLaglen as Hank
Donald Stuart as Buddy
Paul McAllister as St. Andre
Redmond Finlay as Cordere
Boghwan Singh as Prince Ram Singh (as Ram Singh)
 Maurice Murphy as Young Beau

Production
The production was to be filmed in Algeria, but the Rif War interfered, so instead it was filmed in the desert east of Burlingame, California, and southwest of Yuma, Arizona.

Reception
Mordaunt Hall, critic for The New York Times, wrote that "Adventure, romance, mystery and brotherly affection are skillfully linked in the pictorial translation of Percival Christopher Wren's absorbing novel, 'Beau Geste'". He also complimented many of the principal performers: Colman ("easy and sympathetic"), Joyce ("charming"), Trevor ("effective") and Powell ("an excellent character study of Boldini"). Review from Variety describes the film as "It's a well-done mystery-melodrama. [...] there's that lack of change of pace and its length."

Beau Geste won the Photoplay Medal of Honor, presented by Photoplay magazine, one of the industry's first awards recognizing the best picture of the year.

See also
The House That Shadows Built (1931), a promotional film released by Paramount which includes excerpts of this film

References

External links

 Lobby poster
Lobby poster 2

1926 films
1920s color films
American black-and-white films
American silent feature films
Silent American drama films
Films based on British novels
Films based on military novels
Films directed by Herbert Brenon
Films about the French Foreign Legion
Films set in deserts
Films shot in Arizona
Films shot in California
Paramount Pictures films
Siege films
Films set in Africa
Photoplay Awards film of the year winners
1920s American films
Films with screenplays by John Russell (screenwriter)
Films set in the Sahara
Films set in Kent
Films about orphans
1920s English-language films